Alexander Gontchenkov (born April 4, 1970) is a Ukrainian former professional racing cyclist, who competed early in his career on the track and throughout his professional career (1993–2000) on the road. He competed in two events at the 1992 Summer Olympics for the Unified Team.

Major results 

1988
 1st  Team pursuit, UCI Junior Track Cycling World Championships
1990
 1st  Amateur team pursuit, UCI Track World Championships (with Dmitri Nelyubin, Evgueni Berzin, & Valeri Baturo)
 2nd Amateur team pursuit, National Track Championships
1992
 1st 
1993
 3rd Paris–Tours
 9th Overall Three Days of De Panne
1994
 6th Overall Four Days of Dunkirk
 7th Overall Kellogg's Tour
 10th Overall Three Days of De Panne
1995
 2nd Brabantse Pijl
 9th Overall Vuelta a Andalucía
1996
 1st Stage 16 Giro d'Italia
 2nd Overall Tour de Romandie
1st Stage 4
 2nd Milan–San Remo
 2nd Overall Tirreno–Adriatico
 2nd Trofeo Pantalica
 2nd Overall Vuelta a Andalucía
 4th Amstel Gold Race
 5th Telekom Grand Prix (with Marco Fincato)
 7th La Flèche Wallonne
 8th Overall Tour of the Basque Country
1997
 1st Gran Premio Città di Camaiore
 1st Giro dell'Emilia
 1st Stage 3 Giro di Sardegna
 2nd Clásica de San Sebastián
 3rd Road race, Russian National Road Championships
 3rd Clásica Internacional de Alcobendas
 5th GP Ouest–France
 5th Trofeo Matteotti
 6th Overall Tour Méditerranéen
1st Stage 5
 7th Paris–Brussels
 9th Wincanton Classic
 10th Züri-Metzgete
1998
 1st Stage 3a Four Days of Dunkirk
 5th Giro della Provincia di reggio Calabria
 9th Trofeo Melinda
 9th Giro del Veneto
1999
 1st Stage 4 Giro del Trentino
 5th Rund um den Henninger Turm

References

External links
 

Ukrainian track cyclists
Ukrainian male cyclists
Soviet male cyclists
1970 births
Living people
Sportspeople from Lviv
Olympic cyclists of the Unified Team
Cyclists at the 1992 Summer Olympics
Ukrainian Giro d'Italia stage winners